Oreino is a former municipality in the Kavala regional unit, East Macedonia and Thrace, Greece. Since the 2011 local government reform it is part of the municipality Nestos, of which it is a municipal unit. The municipal unit has an area of 318.555 km2. Population 1,212 (2011). The seat of the municipality was in Lekani.

References

Populated places in Kavala (regional unit)

el:Δήμος Νέστου#Δημοτική ενότητα Ορεινού